Calamus australis, commonly known as wait-a-while, hairy mary or lawyer cane, is a plant in the palm family Arecaceae which is endemic to the rainforests of north east Queensland, Australia. Like other species in the genus Calamus, this is a climbing plant with a very long and flexible stem. It uses sharp strong hooks on the fronds and tendrils to attach itself to other vegetation, such as taller established trees, thus gaining support that enables it to grow higher towards the canopy. This species is very similar to C. radicalis, with which it coexists, but is smaller in almost all respects.

Description
The leaves (or fronds) are produced on the youngest part of the stem, and the older sections are bare as the leaves age and fall off (exactly the same process as the more familiar upright palm with a stout stem). The older, leafless part of the stem of Calamus australis is smooth and glossy green. 

Tendrils, measuring several metres in length and armed with many stout, recurved barbs are produced from the leaf sheath. Leaves are armed with stout recurved barbs on the lower surfaces of the rachis. Unlike its very similar sister species C. radicalis, it does not have spines on the leaflets themselves.

Fruits are a white or cream drupe, around  diameter, with a scaly exterior. They contain a single round seed which is surrounded by a thin layer of soft edible flesh.

Taxonomy
Calamus australis was first described 1838 by the German botanist Carl Friedrich Philipp von Martius in volume 3 of his highly regarded work Historia naturalis palmarum.

Distribution and habitat
This is the most widespread of the eight Australian species of Calamus. It grows in gallery forest and well developed rainforest.

Ecology
Fruits of this species are eaten by fruit doves (genus Ptilinopus) and cassowaries (Casuarius casuarius).

Conservation
This species is listed by the Queensland Department of Environment and Science as least concern. , it has not been assessed by the IUCN.

Uses
Indigenous Australians had many used for this plant and its sister species. The young shoots were eaten, along with the fruits. The long flexible stem was used to construct shelters, make axe handles, fish traps, snares, and waist straps for climbing trees, and the thorny tendrils were used to catch fish.

Gallery

References

External links
 
 
 View a map of historical sightings of this species at the Australasian Virtual Herbarium
 View observations of this species on iNaturalist
 View images of this species on Flickriver

australis
Endemic flora of Queensland
Taxa named by Carl Friedrich Philipp von Martius
Plants described in 1838
Vines